James Anthony Tamayo (born October 23, 1949) is an American prelate of the Roman Catholic Church.  He has been serving as bishop of the Diocese of Laredo in Texas since 2000.  He previously served as an auxiliary bishop of the Diocese of Galveston-Houston in Texas from 1993 to 2000.

Biography

Early life and priesthood 
James Tamayo was born on October 23, 1949, in Brownsville, Texas, the son of Antonio P. Tamayo and Guadalupe B. Tamayo. He has a sister, Mrs. Mercy Barrera of Corpus Christi. He holds a Master of Theology degree from the University of St. Thomas in and attended St. Mary's Seminary, both in Houston, Texas. 

Tamayo was ordained a priest by Bishop Thomas Joseph Drury for the Diocese of Corpus Christi on July 11, 1976.

Auxiliary Bishop of Galveston-Houston

Pope John Paul II appointed Tamayo as an auxiliary bishop for the Diocese of Galveston-Houston on January 26, 1993.  He was consecrated by Archbishop Joseph Fiorenza on March 10, 1993. He also became the titular bishop of Ita.

Bishop of Laredo
On July 3, 2000, Pope Paul II appointed Tamayo as bishop of the newly founded Diocese of Laredo.  On August 9, 2000, he was installed as its first bishop.

On September 10, 2008, Tamayo called upon the administration of U.S. President George W. Bush to halt work-place raids in search of illegal immigrants. "We have respect for our enforcement personnel, but these worksite raids are only pitting human beings against each other. We must abandon the raids."In March 2015, Tamayo was among eighty religious figures who signed a letter to President Barack H. Obama asking that the government halt the practice of detaining families who have come into the United States illegally. He visited a detention center in Dilley,Texas and expressed concern for the women being held there, some for a long time.

Controversies

In March 2016, Tamayo halted the construction of a Catholic student center at Texas A&M International University (TAMIU) in Laredo. The Brothers of St. John, key sponsors of the $4 million-plus project, held a groundbreaking ceremony in November 2013. Tamayo did not attend the groundbreaking; nor did he offer an explanation for his opposition to the project, even to TAMIU President Ray Keck. Hundreds of thousands of preliminary funds have already been spent on the project, which has been on the drawing board for a decade.

Glen S. Jackson of Alexandria questioned Tamayo's opposition to the student center, which he said has caused a "hostile atmosphere" in the Laredo diocese. No other college or university has faced such a denial. Jackson claims that 99 percent of the clergy in the Laredo diocese favors the project. Meanwhile, Father Robert L. Kincl, a former judicial vicar for the diocese, announced that he would mail thirty letters opposing Tamayo's position to The Vatican.

In 2002, a priest from New York City was arrested in Laredo on rape charges out of New York. The district attorney of Kings County in New York said that the Diocese of Laredo was "less than satisfactory" in cooperating with law enforcement. Tamayo did not explain the circumstances under which the priest had left the Diocese of Laredo.

See also

 Catholic Church hierarchy
 Catholic Church in the United States
 Historical list of the Catholic bishops of the United States
 List of Catholic bishops of the United States
 Lists of patriarchs, archbishops, and bishops

References

External links
The Diocese of Laredo website

Episcopal succession

1949 births
Living people
Roman Catholic Ecclesiastical Province of San Antonio
People from Laredo, Texas
People from Houston
Religious leaders from Texas
People from Brownsville, Texas
Catholics from Texas
21st-century Roman Catholic bishops in the United States